Punctaconchus is a genus of microconchid tubeworms. It was the last genus of microconchids, and the only genus to exist beyond the Triassic. Their tubes have large pores (punctae) penetrating the tube wall. Tubes lumen is covered by
ripplemark−like transverse ridges. Punctaconchus occurs in the Middle Jurassic of England, France and Poland.

References

Protostome enigmatic taxa
Tentaculita
Jurassic invertebrates
Jurassic animals of Europe